The 2020 MAAC men's soccer tournament, will be the 28th edition of the MAAC Men's Soccer Tournament, a post-season college soccer conference tournament to determine the MAAC champion, and the conference's automatic berth into the NCAA Division I men's soccer tournament. The 2020 edition of the tournament was scheduled to begin on November 12 and conclude on November 15, 2020. In August 2020, the tournament was postponed from November 2020 to April 2021 due to the ongoing COVID-19 pandemic.

Format changes 
Previously, the MAAC Tournament had six teams with the higher seeds hosting the matches. The 2020 season will see the tournament reduced to four teams, with the regular season champion hosting all matches. This was in part done due to the ongoing COVID-19 pandemic. The MAAC indicated that the dates are to be flexible and subject to change if the tournament is to be played at an earlier or later date.

Seeds

Bracket

Schedule

Semifinals

Championship

Statistics

Goalscorers 
To be determined

All-Tournament team

References

External links 
 2020 MAAC Men's Soccer Tournament Central

2020 NCAA Division I men's soccer season
2021 in sports in Connecticut
2021 in sports in New Jersey
2021 in sports in New York (state)
Maac Men's Soccer Tournament
Association football events postponed due to the COVID-19 pandemic